The Currency of Mount Serenity (Arabic: مال جبال السكينة) is a political economic novel by Abdullah Al-Salloum. The novel (Subtitled: The monetary system: from favor to post-tar-inar eras - Arabic: النظام المالي بين حقبتي الامتنان وما بعد الزفتينار) (deposit: 0988-2017 Kuwait National Library) interprets – in a virtual world – the historic development eras of the real monetary system. The title was ranked as best-seller on Jamalon; middle-east's largest online books retailer.

External links 
 Title website

References 

Political novels
2017 novels
Arabic-language novels